Ha Jung-won (born 20 April 1942) is a North Korean football defender who played for North Korea in the 1966 FIFA World Cup.

References

1942 births
North Korean footballers
North Korea international footballers
Association football defenders
1966 FIFA World Cup players
Living people